Mark Arendz Provincial Ski Park is a provincial park in Prince Edward Island, Canada.

It is located in the community of Brookvale and functions as a winter activity park with the following attractions:

 alpine ski hill (the only facility in the province)
 nordic ski and snowshoeing trails
 mountain biking trails (spring, summer, fall)

The facility will host multiple events as part of the 2023 Canada Winter Games. Ahead of the games, $6.2 million dollars was spent renovating and updating the facilities.

References

Provincial parks of Prince Edward Island
Parks in Queens County, Prince Edward Island
Ski areas and resorts in Canada